Parthenos sylvia, the clipper, is a species of nymphalid butterfly found in south and southeast Asia, mostly in forested areas. The clipper is a fast-flying butterfly and has a habit of flying with its wings flapping stiffly between the horizontal position and a few degrees below the horizontal. It may glide between spurts of flapping.

Description

The various forms or subspecies are closely aligned and greatly resemble one another.

Range
The species lives in the Western Ghats, Bangladesh, Assam, Cambodia, Myanmar, Laos, Sri Lanka, and Southeast Asia (Malaya, Philippines, and New Guinea).

Life history
Larva. Cylindrical; head and anal segment with short simple spines; segments three to 12 with longer branched spines, reddish brown, those on three and four comparatively very long. Pale green, with yellowish-white lateral stripes one on each side. 

Pupa. "brown, boat-shaped." (After Davidson & Aitken)

Subspecies
Listed alphabetically:

 P. s. admiralia Rothschild, 1915
 P. s. apicalis Moore, 1878
 P. s. aruana Moore, [1897]
 P. s. bandana Fruhstorfer
 P. s. bellimontis Fruhstorfer, 1899
 P. s. borneensis Staudinger, 1889
 P. s. brunnea Staudinger, 1888
 P. s. couppei Ribbe, 1898
 P. s. cyaneus Moore, 1877
 P. s. ellina Fruhstorfer, 1899
 P. s. gambrisius (Fabricius, 1787)
 P. s. guineensis Fruhstorfer, 1899
 P. s. joloensis Fruhstorfer, 1899
 P. s. lilacinus Butler, 1879 – blue clipper
 P. s. nadiae  (Casteleyn, 2020) 
 P. s. nodrica (Boisduval, 1832)
 P. s. numita Fruhstorfer
 P. s. obiana Fruhstorfer, 1904
 P. s. pherekrates Fruhstorfer, 1904
 P. s. pherekides Fruhstorfer, 1904
 P. s. philippinensis Fruhstorfer, 1899 – brown clipper
 P. s. roepstorfii Moore, [1897]
 P. s. salentia (Hopffer, 1874)
 P. s. silvicola Fruhstorfer, 1897
 P. s. sulana Fruhstorfer, 1899
 P. s. sumatrensis Fruhstorfer, 1899
 P. s. sylla (Donovan, 1798)
 P. s. theriotes Fruhstorfer
 P. s. thesaurinus Grose-Smith, 1897
 P. s. thesaurus Mathew, 1887
 P. s. tualensis Fruhstorfer, 1899
 P. s. ugiensis Fruhstorfer
 P. s. virens Moore, 1877

References

External links

Limenitidinae
Butterflies of Asia
Taxa named by Pieter Cramer
Butterflies described in 1776
Articles containing video clips